The 2020 European Ladies' Team Championship took place 9–12 July at Upsala Golf Club, in Uppsala, Sweden. It was the 37th women's golf amateur European Ladies' Team Championship.

Venue 
The hosting Upsala Golf Club was founded in 1937, the 22nd oldest golf club in Sweden. The course, located in Håmö, 9 kilometres west of the city center of Uppsala, the fourth-largest city in Sweden, was inaugurated in 1965, initially designed by Gregor Paulsson and renovated in 2007–2008 by Canadian golf course architect Robert Kains.

The championship course was set up with par 72 over 6,100 yards.

Format 
The 2020 Championship was played in a different season and in a modified format than usual.

Due to the COVID-19 pandemic, the championship was played in a reduced format, with 12 teams participating, each of them with four players. All competitors played one 18-hole-round of stroke-play on the first day. The team scores were based on the leading three scores of each team.

After the first day the leading eight teams formed flight A and competed in knock-out match-play over the next three days. The teams were being seeded based on their positions after the stroke play. Contests consisted of one foursome game in the morning and two singles in the afternoon. If a game was level after 18 holes, extra holes were played to get a result, although if the overall match result was already determined, later games that were level after 18 holes were halved.

The remaining four teams, not qualified for Flight A, formed Flight B, to meet each other to determine their final standings.

Teams 
12 nation teams contested the event. Each team consisted of four players. 

Among teams not participating were England, Scotland, Ireland and Wales.

Players in the leading teams

Other participating teams

Winners 
Team Switzerland lead  the opening 18-hole qualifying competition, with a 3 under par score of  216, four strokes ahead of France.

Individual leader in the 18-hole stroke-play competition was Pauline Roussin-Bouchard, France, with a score of 4 under par 68, one stroke ahead Ginnie Lee, Switzerland.

Host nation and defending champions Sweden won the championship, beating Germany 2–1 in the final and earned their tenth title and the third in a row.

Team Denmark earned third place, beating Switzerland 2– in the bronze match.

Results 
Qualification round

Team standings

* Note: In the event of a tie the order was determined by the better total non-counting scores.

Individual leaders

Note: There was no official award for the lowest individual score.

Flight A

Bracket

Final games

Flight B

Team matches

Team standings

Final standings

Sources:

See also 
 Espirito Santo Trophy – biennial world amateur team golf championship for women organized by the International Golf Federation.
 European Amateur Team Championship – European amateur team golf championship for men organised by the European Golf Association.
 European Ladies Amateur Championship – European amateur individual golf championship for women organised by the European Golf Association.

References

External links 
 European Golf Association: Results

European Ladies' Team Championship
Golf tournaments in Italy
European Ladies' Team Championship
European Ladies' Team Championship
European Ladies' Team Championship